Marko Sakari Liias (born July 17, 1981) is an American politician serving as a member of the Washington State Senate, representing the 21st district since 2014. The district, located entirely within Snohomish County, includes portions of Lynnwood and Everett, as well as his hometown of Mukilteo and his native Edmonds. A member of the Democratic Party, he previously served as a member of the Washington House of Representatives from 2008 to 2014.

Early life and education
Liias graduated from Kamiak High School in Mukilteo before attending Georgetown University in Washington, D.C., where he served as the president of the Georgetown University College Democrats. While in university, he spent a semester studying in Prague, Czech Republic, during which time he traveled extensively through central Europe. He has also taken graduate courses in public administration at the University of Washington in Seattle. In 2009, Liias completed a John F. Kennedy School of Government program for Senior Executives in State and Local Government as a David Bohnett LGBTQ Victory Institute Leadership Fellow.

Career

Mukilteo City Council 
At the age of 24, Liias was elected to Mukilteo City Council in November 2005, running unopposed. He had previously served on the Snohomish County Alcohol and Drug Advisory Board from 2003 to 2004, and as a member of the Snohomish County Board of Equalization from 2004 to 2006. As a city councilman, he also served as an alternate board member for Community Transit, and as a representative to the Puget Sound Regional Council.

State House
When Rep. Brian Sullivan was elected to Snohomish County Council in November 2007, he resigned his seat in the Washington State Legislature. The Democratic precinct committee officers (PCOs) from the 21st district had the opportunity of selecting his successor, subject to the county council's ratification. With 21 votes, Liias was their first choice, defeating Lynnwood city councilman Mark Smith (16 votes) and Snohomish County Labor Council president Darrell Chapman (15 votes). The council voted unanimously to confirm the choice of the PCOs and appointed Liias to the seat.

After being elected to his first full term in 2008, Liias was selected as the Vice Chair of the House Transportation Committee, one of three budget-writing committees in the House of Representatives. He was also selected to serve on the influential Rules Committee, which plays a critical gatekeeping role in the legislative process. Liias served on three other committees: Education, Agriculture & Natural Resources, and Community & Economic Development & Trade. In January 2011, Liias was reappointed as Vice Chair of the House Transportation Committee, and he was appointed to the Education Committee and the Technology, Energy and Communications Committee.

State Senate
In January 2014, the district state senator, Paull Shin, resigned due in part to a diagnosis of Alzheimer's disease. The Democratic precinct committee officers (PCOs) from the 21st district selected then- Rep. Liias as their sole nominee for the seat. Their choice was confirmed unanimously by the Snohomish County Council and Liias was sworn in as state senator on January 22, 2014.

Congressional candidate
On August 2, 2011, Liias announced he would be a candidate in 2012 for the 1st district seat in the U.S. House held by Congressman Jay Inslee, who retired to mount a successful bid for governor.

As a result of Washington's decennial redistricting process (and the addition of a tenth congressional district), Liias's home was moved out of the 1st congressional district. Liias responded by dropping his congressional campaign on December 29, 2011, and announcing he would seek re-election to the legislature in 2012.

State Treasurer race

On May 19, 2016, Liias announced he was running for State Treasurer. In the primary election held on August 2, 2016, the two Republican candidates placed first and second, with the three Democratic candidates placing third, fourth and fifth. Liias placed third, earning 20% of the vote.

Lieutenant Governor race 

Liias ran for Lieutenant Governor of Washington in 2020. He came in second in the primary but was defeated by Denny Heck in the general election.

Elections

Liias was elected to a full term in November 2008. He did not face a Democratic primary challenge but was challenged by a Republican, 18-year-old Andrew Funk, in the general election. Liias prevailed easily, receiving nearly 64% of the vote.

In 2010, Liias was challenged by Republican Elizabeth Scott from Edmonds and won re-election with 54% of the vote. In the 2012 election, Liias won 60% of the vote to defeat Republican challenger Kevin Morrison, a candidate who entered the primary as a write-in but whose name appeared on the general election ballot. He served in the state house until he was appointed and duly sworn in as the district's state senator on January 22, 2014.

Political Positions

LGBTQIA+ rights
Liias supports transgender rights and supports gender affirming care for youth that identify as being transgender.

Personal life
Liias is openly gay. He is of Finnish American descent and speaks Finnish.

References

External links
House of Representatives homepage
Campaign website

1981 births
21st-century American politicians
American people of Finnish descent
Gay politicians
Georgetown University alumni
LGBT state legislators in Washington (state)
Living people
Democratic Party members of the Washington House of Representatives
People from Edmonds, Washington
Politicians from Everett, Washington
People from Mukilteo, Washington
Washington (state) city council members
Democratic Party Washington (state) state senators